Zhukovo is a rural locality (a selo) and the administrative centre of Zhukovsky Selsoviet, Ufimsky District, Bashkortostan, Russia. The population was 1,685 as of 2010. There are 57 streets.

Geography 
Zhukovo is located 28 km southwest of Ufa (the district's administrative centre) by road. Mysovtsevo is the nearest rural locality.

References 

Rural localities in Ufimsky District